Chaykin is a surname. Notable people with the surname include:

Surname 
Howard Chaykin (born 1950), American comic book artist and writer
Maury Chaykin (1949–2010), American-Canadian actor

Characters 
 Lester Knight Chaykin, protagonist of the 1991 video game Another World